Ben-Gurion Day is an Israeli national holiday celebrated annually on the sixth of the Hebrew month of Kislev, to commemorate the life and vision of Zionist leader, and Israel's first Prime Minister David Ben-Gurion.

History
Ben Gurion Day was created by the Israeli Knesset as part of the Ben-Gurion Law. According to the law, Ben-Gurion Day shall be held once a year, on Kislev 6, the date of David Ben-Gurion's death. On this day state memorial services shall be marked by the institutions of the State of Israel, on bases of the Israel Defense Forces, and in schools. If the sixth of Kislev falls on Shabbat eve, or on Shabbat, the memorial day shall be held on the following Sunday.

See also
Public holidays in Israel
Culture of Israel
Jewish holidays

References

Kislev observances
National holidays
Public holidays in Israel
Commemoration of David Ben-Gurion